James McCallum (October 3, 1806 – September 16, 1889) was a Confederate politician who served in the Confederate States Congress during the American Civil War.

McCallum was born in Robeson County, North Carolina, and later moved to Pulaski, Tennessee and practiced law. He served in the Tennessee state legislature from 1861 to 1863 and represented the state in the Second Confederate Congress from 1864 to 1865.

References

External links
The Political Graveyard

1806 births
1889 deaths
Members of the Confederate House of Representatives from Tennessee
19th-century American politicians
People from Robeson County, North Carolina
Members of the Tennessee House of Representatives
Tennessee lawyers
People from Pulaski, Tennessee
19th-century American lawyers

cy:James McCallum